Athée is a commune in the Mayenne department in northwestern France.

Geography
The Oudon flows through the commune and forms most of its southwestern border and part of its northeastern border.

Population

See also
Communes of Mayenne

References

Communes of Mayenne